|}

This is a list of results for the Legislative Council at the 1985 South Australian state election.

Continuing members 

The following MLCs were not up for re-election this year.

Election results

See also
 Candidates of the 1985 South Australian state election
 Members of the South Australian Legislative Council, 1985–1989

References

1985
1985 elections in Australia
1980s in South Australia